The Witchcraft Act 1735 (9 Geo. 2 c. 5) was an Act of the Parliament of the Kingdom of Great Britain in 1735 which made it a crime for a person to claim that any human being had magical powers or was guilty of practising witchcraft. With this, the law abolished the hunting and executions of witches in Great Britain. The maximum penalty set out by the Act was a year's imprisonment.

It thus marks the end point of the witch trials in the Early Modern period for Great Britain and the beginning of the "modern legal history of witchcraft", repealing the earlier Witchcraft Acts which were originally based in an intolerance toward practitioners of magic but became mired in contested Christian doctrine and superstitious witch-phobia. Instead of assuming as the earlier laws did that witches were real and had real magical power derived from pacts with Satan, the new law assumed that there were no real witches, no one had real magic power and those claiming such powers were cheaters extorting money from gullible people.

The law was reverting to the view of the primitive and the medieval Church, expressed from at least the 8th century, at the Council of Paderborn, but contested by witch-phobic Dominican Inquisitors beginning in the mid 15th century, with some success in forwarding a new doctrine among the popes, as seen in the papal bull Summis desiderantes affectibus (1484), but with far less success among the bishops. Thus the Act of 1735 reflected the general trend in Europe, where after a peak around 1600, and a series of outbursts in the late 17th century, witch-trials quickly subsided after 1700. The last person executed for witchcraft in Great Britain was Janet Horne in 1727.

History of the Witchcraft Act 1735

Initially presented to the House of Commons on 27 January 1735/6 by John Conduitt, Sir John Crosse and George Heathcote, the Act received royal assent on 24 March and came into effect on 24 June. 
In the words of Davies (1999), the new law meant that witchcraft was "no longer to be considered a criminal act, but rather an offence against the country's newly enlightened state". Up until 1772, it was illegal for the newspapers to report on parliamentary debates, meaning that there is a lack of archival material on the parliamentary debate on the implementation of the Act.
According to Davies, it appears that the Act "generated only a modicum of debate" within Parliament, with several amendments being suggested in both the House of Commons and the House of Lords.

The only figure to offer significant opposition to the Act was Lord James Erskine. Erskine not only fervently believed in the existence of witchcraft, but, it has been argued, also held beliefs that were deeply rooted in "Scottish political and religious considerations" and which caused him to reject the Act. His objection to the Act "marked him out as an eccentric verging on the insane" among Members of Parliament, and in turn his political opponents would use it against him; one of his staunchest critics, Robert Walpole, who was then the de facto prime minister of the country, allegedly stating that he no longer considered Erskine to be a serious political threat as a result of his embarrassing opposition to the Act.

The Witchcraft Act 1735 was frequently invoked in the early years of the 19th century in an attempt by the political elite to root out "ignorance, superstition, criminality and insurrection" among the general populace, and even more so under a new statute brought in to reinforce the 1735 Act in 1824.

Modern history
In September 1943, Helen Duncan was jailed under the Witchcraft Act 1735 on the grounds that she had claimed to summon spirits. Her followers often contend that her imprisonment was in fact at the behest of superstitious military intelligence officers, who feared that she would reveal the secret plans for D-Day. After being caught faking a spiritual manifestation, she was arrested during a seance and indicted with seven punishable counts: two of conspiracy to contravene the Witchcraft Act 1735, two of obtaining money by false pretences, and three of public mischief (a common law offence). She spent nine months in prison. Duncan has been frequently described as the last person to be convicted under the Act.

Another candidate for the last person convicted under the Act was Jane Rebecca Yorke of Forest Gate in east London. On 26 September 1944 at the Central Criminal Court, Yorke was convicted on seven counts of "pretending...to cause the spirits of deceased persons to be present" and bound over.

The last threatened use of the Act against a medium was in 1950.

In 1951, the Witchcraft Act 1735 was repealed with the enactment of the Fraudulent Mediums Act 1951, largely at the instigation of Spiritualists through the agency of Thomas Brooks MP.

The South African Witchcraft Suppression Act, 1957, which is still in force, was based on similar 19th-century laws in the Cape Colony which were themselves based on the Witchcraft Act 1735.

References

Footnotes

Bibliography

External links

Great Britain Acts of Parliament 1736
Legal history of the United Kingdom
1735